The ROH Women's World Championship is a women's professional wrestling world championship created and promoted by the American professional wrestling promotion Ring of Honor (ROH). The current champion is Athena, who is in her first reign.

History
On January 1, 2020, the ROH Women of Honor World Championship was deactivated when the last champion Kelly Klein was stripped of the championship after ROH didn't renew her contract. A new tournament to crown the inaugural ROH Women's World Champion was set to start on April 24 of that year at Quest for Gold, however, ROH postponed all future events due to the COVID-19 pandemic. (The title replaced the ROH Women of Honor World Title in the ROH Women of Honor division.)

On March 26, 2021, at ROH 19th Anniversary Show, ROH Board of Directors member Maria Kanellis-Bennett announced a tournament to crown a new ROH Women's World Champion. On July 11, at Best in the World, the tournament bracket and the championship itself were revealed.

On September 12, 2021 Rok-C defeated Miranda Alize via pinfall at the ROH pay-per-view Death Before Dishonor XVIII, the culmination of a 15-woman singles elimination tournament to become the inaugural ROH Women's World Championship holder.

On October 27, 2021, Ring of Honor announced that it would go on a hiatus after Final Battle in December, with a return tentatively scheduled for April 2022. All personnel would also be released from their contracts as part of plans to "reimagine" the company as a "fan-focused product". After Final Battle, several ROH wrestlers began to appear on other promotions and defended the titles. Rok-C defended the title against Impact Wrestling's Deonna Purrazzo during a television taping. However, Rok-C was defeated and lost the title to Purrazzo.

In early 2022, during the hiatus, then-ROH Women's World Champion Purrazzo was booked for the Multiverse of Matches at WrestleCon, which happened to be when the Supercard of Honor XV event was later scheduled for April 1, 2022. Purrazzo was unable to attend the latter event. At Supercard of Honor XV, Mercedes Martinez defeated Willow Nightingale to become the Interim ROH Women's World Champion and earned the opportunity to face lineal champion Purrazzo in a unification match at a later date. On the May 4, 2022 episode of Dynamite, Martinez defeated Purrazzo to become the undisputed ROH Women's World Champion.

Inaugural championship tournament (2021)

Reigns

Rok-C was the inaugural champion. Mercedes Martinez's reign is the longest reign at 220 days, while Deonna Purrazzo has the shortest reign at 115 days. Mercedes Martinez is the oldest champion at 41 years old, while Rok-C is the youngest champion at 19 years old.

Athena is the current champion in her first reign. She defeated Mercedes Martinez on December 10, 2022, at Final Battle in Arlington, TX.

See also
 World Women's Championship (disambiguation)

References

External links
  ROH Women's World Championship at Cagematch.net

Ring of Honor championships
Women's professional wrestling championships
World professional wrestling championships